Francis Ogbonnaya Otunta (29 April 1958 – 30 March 2021) was a Nigerian mathematician and academic administrator. He was the fifth Vice-Chancellor of Michael Okpara University of Agriculture upon his appointment in December 2015.

Career
Prior to his appointment as 5th Vice-Chancellor of Michael Okpara University of Agriculture, Otunta had previously worked as a Professor of Mathematics at the University of Benin. He was also a former Rector of Akanu Ibiam Federal Polytechnic, Unwana, a post he held from 20062014. Prof. Francis O. Otunta took the mantle of leadership as the Vice-Chancellor of Michael Okpara University of Agriculture, Umudike from Prof. Hillary Edeoga officially on 1 March 2016.

Personal life
Otunta hailed from Amangwu Nkpoghoro Village in Afikpo North Local Government Area of Ebonyi State, Nigeria. He was married to Bertha Otunta with whom he had six children.

Death

He died in a vehicle accident and was buried on September 10, 2021, in Afikpo.

See also
 List of people from Ebonyi State

References

1958 births
2021 deaths
People from Ebonyi State
Vice-Chancellors of Nigerian universities
Academic staff of Akanu Ibiam Federal Polytechnic
Academic staff of the University of Benin (Nigeria)
Academic staff of Michael Okpara University of Agriculture